Per Henricsson (born 9 August 1969) is a former professional tennis player from Sweden. He enjoyed most of his tennis success while playing doubles. During his career, he won two doubles titles. He achieved a career-high doubles ranking of world No. 65 in 1990.

Career finals

Doubles (2 titles, 3 runner-ups)

External links
 
 

Swedish male tennis players
Tennis players from Stockholm
1969 births
Living people
20th-century Swedish people